There are 21 protected areas of the United States designated as national preserves. They were established by an act of Congress to protect areas that have resources often associated with national parks but where certain natural resource-extractive activities such as hunting and mining may be permitted, provided their natural values are preserved. The activities permitted in each national preserve vary depending on the enabling legislation of the unit. All national preserves are managed by the National Park Service (NPS) as part of the National Park System. 

Eleven national preserves are co-managed with national parks or national monuments; because hunting is forbidden in those units, preserves provide a similar level of protection from development but allow hunting and in some cases grazing. Nine of those are counted as separate official units, while New River Gorge National Park and Preserve and Oregon Caves National Monument and Preserve are each single units, though there is no administrative difference. The remaining ten are stand-alone units. Jean Lafitte National Historical Park and Preserve has a preserve site that is managed like one, but is not distinguished as a national preserve in the authorizing legislation and is not listed here. The Salt River Bay National Historical Park and Ecological Preserve is a unique designation that is dissimilar to national preserves. 

National preserves are located in eleven states; Alaska is home to ten of them, including the largest, Noatak National Preserve. All national preserves except Tallgrass Prairie permit hunting in accordance with local regulations. A national preserve differs from a national reserve as management of reserves can be delegated to the state in which they are located.

History 

The first national preserves were Big Thicket National Preserve in Texas and Big Cypress National Preserve in Florida, both established in 1974. The Big Cypress Swamp, adjacent to Everglades National Park and originally intended to be included in it, was at risk of destruction by a proposed airport. Opposition by conservationists and studies showing the swamp's role in water protection led to its cancellation after one runway was built, and President Richard Nixon proposed the area's preservation as Big Cypress National Fresh Water Reserve to protect the local water supply. Congressional deliberation resulted in a new designation of a national preserve that bought out private landowners to conserve "the natural, scenic, hydrologic, floral and faunaI, and recreational values of the Big Cypress Watershed," though off-road vehicle use, oil extraction, hunting, and traditional use by the Miccosukee and Seminole Tribes are permitted.

The Big Thicket, a large area of swamps and forests, was originally proposed to be preserved as a state park or national park, but these were opposed by timber firms who wanted to retain their logging lands. A 1967 survey by the National Park Service proposed establishing nine units representative of the variety of plant life in the region, but because the thicket was already fragmented by roads and logging, it would not qualify as a national park. National monument was also deemed a suboptimal designation, and compromise on the boundary and management provisions eventually led to its establishment as a national preserve. The bills creating both preserves were signed on the same day by President Gerald Ford and contained similar wording limiting construction, agriculture, and mineral extraction to that still assuring the area's "natural and ecological integrity in perpetuity," while permitting hunting. 

Following President Jimmy Carter's 1978 establishment of 17 national monuments in Alaska, the Alaska National Interest Lands Conservation Act of 1980 redesignated four as national preserves and six as national parks or monuments paired with a preserve. These had been recommended during the legislative process as early as 1974 to resolve the issue of sport hunting at Lake Clark after it was used for Big Thicket and Big Cypress. While this was not the primary factor in the naming of the original national preserves, it presented a compromise to protect scenic lands and allow hunting in the National Park System without breaking precedent in parks and monuments that forbid it. The national preserves are managed in the same way as national parks, except that regulated hunting, fishing, and trapping for sport and subsistence are permitted, though the NPS can close areas to such practices as needed. Although hunting was also allowed at most national recreation areas, this was a major change in NPS wildlife management with a fifth of its land now open to it.

Five new units were established from 1988 to 2000, two of which are partnerships with local governments and landowners. The Timucuan Ecological and Historic Preserve includes sites owned by Florida State Parks, the city of Jacksonville, and private landowners. The Tallgrass Prairie National Preserve is so designated to accommodate a public-private partnership reducing federal land ownership, and it is almost entirely owned by The Nature Conservancy. Valles Caldera National Preserve was originally established in 2000 to be operated by an independent trust, but its management was transferred to the National Park Service in 2015.

The four most recently established national preserves were all expansions or redesignations of existing NPS sites. Great Sand Dunes National Monument was redesignated a national park, and the mountainous wilderness area transferred to it from the U.S. Forest Service became the preserve. President Bill Clinton expanded Craters of the Moon National Monument using the Antiquities Act, and most of the expanded area was redesignated a national preserve two years later to permit hunting. Oregon Caves National Monument gained its preserve lands from Rogue River–Siskiyou National Forest, increasing the unit's size ninefold. Ten percent of New River Gorge National River was redesignated a national park where hunting was disallowed, and the remainder became New River Gorge National Preserve with little change.

List of national preserves 

Preserves paired with a national park or monument do not have visitation separately recorded. Their combined visitor counts are marked in italics, as the number visiting the preserve portions may be substantially smaller. Among these eleven, only Lake Clark and Wrangell–St. Elias have most of their facilities in the preserve.

See also

 List of areas in the United States National Park System – National preserves
 History of the National Park Service
 List of the United States National Park System official units
 List of national monuments of the United States

References

National Preserve